Furnace annealing is a process used in semiconductor device fabrication which consist of heating multiple semiconductor wafers in order to affect their electrical properties. Heat treatments are designed for different effects. Wafers can be heated in order to activate dopants, change film to film or film to wafer substrate interfaces, densify deposited films, change states of grown films, repair damage from implants, move dopants or drive dopants from one film into another or from a film into the wafer substrate. During ion implantation process, the crystal substrate is damaged due to bombardment with high energy ions. The damage caused can be repaired by subjecting the crystal to high temperature. This process is called annealing. Furnace anneals may be integrated into other furnace processing steps, such as oxidations, or may be processed on their own.

Furnace anneals are performed by equipment especially built to heat semiconductor wafers. Furnaces are capable of processing many wafers at a time but each process can last between several hours and a day. Increasingly, furnace anneals are being supplanted by Rapid Thermal Anneal (RTA) or Rapid Thermal Processing (RTP).  This is due to the relatively long thermal cycles of furnaces that causes the dopants that are being activated, especially boron, to diffuse farther than is intended.  RTP or RTA fixes this by having thermal cycles for each wafer that is of the order of minutes rather than hours for furnace anneals.

Equipment
 Consolidated Engineering Company  Annealing furnaces cover a broad range of Steel and Aluminum applications including tempering, normalizing, and aging, and similar automated loading, unloading and natural or forced cooling is possible with roller hearth, tip-up or batch arrangements.
 Koyo Thermo Systems annealing furnaces for semiconductor, solar, display and electronic applications
 Tokyo Electron Limited TELFORMULA and TELINDY PLUS
  Annealing furnaces -  for high or low carbon steel wire or strip, low carbon and alloy steel.
  annealing furnaces for semiconductor applications including NVM, TFH, magnetic sensors & inductors.  

Semiconductor device fabrication